David da Hora da Conceição (born 9 January 2000), simply known as David, is a Brazilian footballer who plays as a forward for Fortaleza.

Club career
David was born in Salvador, Bahia, and joined Vitória's youth setup at the age of 11, after a trial in his neighborhood. He made his first team debut on 17 February 2021, starting and scoring his team's second in a 3–3 Campeonato Baiano away draw against UNIRB.

David became a regular starter for Vitória during the season, and renewed his contract until 2024 on 1 May 2021. On 23 October, he scored a brace in a 4–0 home routing of Brasil de Pelotas, and also scored twice on 14 November in a 3–0 home win over Cruzeiro. He finished the season with 11 goals, being the club's top goalscorer but being unable to avoid team relegation.

In March 2022, Vitória accepted an offer of € 1.2 million from Ukrainian side FC Metalist Kharkiv for David. However, he asked to leave his new club in the following month, and signed a four-year contract with Fortaleza on 6 May, being initially assigned to the under-23 squad.

Career statistics

References

2000 births
Living people
Sportspeople from Salvador, Bahia
Brazilian footballers
Association football forwards
Campeonato Brasileiro Série B players
Esporte Clube Vitória players
FC Metalist Kharkiv players
Fortaleza Esporte Clube players
Brazilian expatriate footballers
Brazilian expatriate sportspeople in Ukraine
Expatriate footballers in Ukraine